Schwa with diaeresis (Ӛ ӛ; italics: Ӛ ӛ) is a letter of the Cyrillic script.

Usage
This letter usually represents the close-mid central unrounded vowel .

Computing codes

See also
Ә ә : Cyrillic Schwa
Ə ə : Latin Ə
Schwa

Cyrillic letters with diacritics
Letters with diaeresis